The Philippine House Committee on Disaster Resilience, or House Disaster Resilience Committee is a standing committee of the Philippine House of Representatives.

The said committee was previously called as the Committee on Disaster Management.

Jurisdiction 
As prescribed by House Rules, the committee's jurisdiction includes the following:
 Disaster and calamities both natural and man-made
 Policies, plans, programs and projects related to disaster risk and vulnerability reduction and management including disaster preparedness and resiliency, relief and rescue, recovery, rehabilitation and reconstruction

Members, 18th Congress

See also 
 House of Representatives of the Philippines
 List of Philippine House of Representatives committees
 National Disaster Risk Reduction and Management Council

Notes

References

External links 
House of Representatives of the Philippines

Disaster Management